The following is a list of notable deaths in October 2007.

Entries for each day are listed alphabetically by surname. A typical entry lists information in the following sequence:
 Name, age, country of citizenship at birth, subsequent country of citizenship (if applicable), reason for notability, cause of death (if known), and reference.

October 2007

1
Bernard Delaire, 108, French Naval veteran of World War I, one of the last six identified.
Bruce Hay, 57, British rugby player for Britain and Scotland, brain tumour.
Ronnie Hazlehurst, 79, British theme song composer (Are You Being Served?) and jazz musician, stroke.
Israel Kugler, 90, American labor leader and professor, pneumonia.
Harry Lee, 75, American politician, Sheriff of Jefferson Parish, Louisiana, leukemia.
Chris Mainwaring, 41, Australian footballer (West Coast Eagles), television and radio sports journalist.
Peggy Maley, 84, American actress.
James A. Martin, 105, American Roman Catholic Jesuit priest, world's oldest Jesuit, pneumonia.
Al Oerter, 71, American athlete and Olympic gold medallist in discus (1956, 1960, 1964 and 1968), heart failure.
Tetsuo Okamoto, 75, Brazilian swimmer and Brazil's first Olympic swimming medallist (1952), respiratory failure.
Pedro Saúl Pérez, 54, Dominican advocate for the rights of Dominican immigrants in Puerto Rico, heart attack.
Ned Sherrin, 76, British broadcaster and theatre producer, throat cancer.
Ralph W. Sturges, 88, American Mohegan tribal chief.
Henry Wells, 92, American expert on Latin American politics, professor and author, complications from Alzheimer's disease.

2
Frederick Bayer, 85, American emeritus curator at the Smithsonian Institution's National Museum of Natural History, heart failure.
DeWitt "Tex" Coulter, 82, American National and Canadian Football League player.
Gianni Danzi, 67, Italian Archbishop of the Territorial Prelature of Loreto.
Elfi von Dassanowsky, 83, Austrian opera singer, actress and film producer.
Christopher Derrick, 86, British writer.
Šime Đodan, 79, Croatian parliamentarian, defence minister (1991).
Gary Franklin, 79, American film critic, KABC-TV (Los Angeles).
Richard Goldwater, 71, American president of Archie Comics, creator of Josie and the Pussycats, cancer.
George Grizzard, 79, American actor, lung cancer.
Princess Katherine of Greece and Denmark, 94, Greek former Princess of Greece, last surviving great-granddaughter of Queen Victoria.
Dan Keating, 105, Irish republican activist, last surviving veteran of the Irish War of Independence.
J. Edward Lundy, 92, American automobile executive (Ford Motor Co.).
Tawn Mastrey, 53, American radio disc jockey (KNAC), hepatitis C.
James Michaels, 86, American editor of Forbes (1961–1999), pneumonia.
*José Antonio Ríos Granados, 48, Mexican politician, mayor of Tultitlán (2000–2003), air crash. 
Willi Rössler, 83, German Olympic fencer.
Alec Spalding, 84, British scout leader.

3

John Buxton, 73, New Zealand rugby union player.
Violet Kazue de Cristoforo, 90, American poet, held in Japanese-American internment camps during WWII, stroke.
Kenneth R. Harding, 93, American Sergeant at Arms of the United States House of Representatives (1972–1980), pneumonia.
Wyn Harness, 47, British journalist.
Herbert Muschamp, 59, American architecture critic for The New York Times, lung cancer.
Pablo Palazuelo, 90, Spanish artist.
Tony Ryan, 71, Irish entrepreneur and joint founder of Ryanair, after long illness.
Rogelio Salmona, 78, Colombian architect, Alvar Aalto Medal and Prince Claus Award winner, cancer.
Sir Richard Trant, 79, British Army general.
Giuseppe Valdengo, 93, Italian operatic baritone.
M. N. Vijayan, 77, Indian academic, writer and journalist, heart attack.

4

Bob Burdick, 70, American NASCAR driver.
Chen Chi-li, 64, Chinese-born Taiwanese gangster, killer of dissident journalist Henry Liu, pancreatic cancer.
Antonie Iorgovan, 59, Romanian politician, main author of the Constitution of Romania, heart attack.
Kim Min-woo, 21, South Korean ice dancer., traffic collision.
Don Nottebart, 71, American Major League Baseball player, stroke.

5
John Atchison, 53, American federal prosecutor and alleged child sex offender, suicide.
Alexandra Boulat, 45, French photojournalist, aneurysm.
Walter Kempowski, 78, German author and archivist, intestinal cancer.
Władysław Kopaliński, 99, Polish lexicographer.
Vladimir Kuzin, 77, Russian 1956 Winter Olympics gold medallist, long illness. 
Steven Massarsky, 59, American attorney and businessman, complications related to cancer.
Edwyn Owen, 71, American ice hockey player, gold medallist at the 1960 Winter Olympics, car fire.
Matilde Salvador i Segarra, 89, Spanish composer, stroke.
Justin Tuveri, 109, Italian-French World War I veteran.

6

Babasaheb Bhosale, 86, Indian politician, Chief Minister of Maharashtra (1982–1983).
Robert W. Bussard, 79, American physicist, researcher of nuclear fusion, cancer.
Jo Ann Davis, 57, American member of the US House of Representatives from Virginia since 2001, breast cancer.
Nancy DeShone, 75, American baseball player (AAGPBL)
Rodney Diak, 83, British stage and film actor, cancer.
Phil Dodds, American audio engineer, cancer.
Bud Ekins, 77, American motorcycle racer and stunt performer (The Great Escape), natural causes.
Terence Wilmot Hutchison, 95, British economist.
Tom Murphy, 39, Irish Tony Award-winning actor of stage and screen (The Beauty Queen of Leenane), lymphatic cancer.
Laza Ristovski, 51, Serbian keyboardist (Smak, Bijelo dugme), multiple sclerosis.
George F. Senner, Jr., 85, American member of the US House of Representatives from Arizona (1963–1967).

7

Norifumi Abe, 32, Japanese MotoGP racer, traffic accident.
Stéphane Maurice Bongho-Nouarra, 70, Congolese Prime Minister (1992).
Sir Alan Campbell, 88, British diplomat.
Sisi Chen, 68, Chinese actress, pancreatic cancer.
Paul Cullen, 98, Australian army general.
Luciana Frassati Gawronska, 105, Polish-Italian writer and anti-Nazi activist, mother of Jas Gawronski.
Herb Parker, 86, American educator and football coach.
George E. Sangmeister, 76, American member of the US House of Representatives from Illinois (1989–1995), leukemia.
Jiřina Steimarová, 91, Czech actress.
Lilis Suryani, 59, Indonesian singer, uterine cancer.
Joe Waggonner, 89, American member of the US House of Representatives from Louisiana (1961–1979).

8
Constantine Andreou, 90, Brazilian-born Greek-French painter and sculptor.
Milan Đukić, 61, Serbian-Croatian politician, leader of the Serb People's Party.
*John Henry, 32, American Hall of Fame thoroughbred racehorse, euthanized after kidney failure.
Nicky James, 64, British pop singer (The Moody Blues), brain tumour.
Zdzisław Peszkowski, 89, Polish Roman Catholic priest, advocate for the families of Katyn victims.
*Salem Sabah Al-Salem Al-Sabah, 69, Kuwaiti politician, member of the ruling family, after long illness.
Francis Schewetta, 88, French Olympic silver medal-winning (1948) athlete.
Jean-François Van Der Motte, 93, Belgian Olympic cyclist.
Chick Zamick, 81, Canadian ice hockey player.

9

Enrico Banducci, 85, American nightclub impresario (North Beach, San Francisco).
Carol Bruce, 87, American actress (WKRP in Cincinnati, Planes, Trains & Automobiles, American Gigolo), chronic obstructive pulmonary disease.
Henk van Brussel, 72, Dutch footballer and football manager, heart attack.
Fausto Correia, 55, Portuguese politician, heart attack.
Belinda Dann, 107, Australian centenarian, longest-lived member of the Stolen Generation.
Mary Louise Kolanko, 75, American baseball player (All-American Girls Professional Baseball League).
Robert McGehee, 64, American Chairman and Chief Executive Officer of Progress Energy Inc, stroke.
Dudley Ryder, 7th Earl of Harrowby, 84, British aristocrat and banker.
Kurt Schwaen, 98, German composer, natural causes.
Bram Zeegers, 58, Dutch lawyer and key witness in the trial of Willem Holleeder.

10

Ambrose De Paoli, 73, American-born Roman Catholic Archbishop, nuncio to Australia, leukemia.
Ken Fry, 86, Australian politician, MP for Fraser (1974–1984).
Francis García, 49, Mexican transvestite actress and designer, pulmonary thrombosis. 
Len Keogh, 76, Australian politician, MP for Bowman (1969–1975, 1983–1987).
Norman Mashabane, 51, South African politician, former ambassador to Indonesia, car accident.
Mehmed Uzun, 54, Turkish novelist, stomach cancer.

11

Sri Chinmoy, 76, Indian-born philosopher and guru, heart attack.
Ignatius D'Cunha, 83, Indian Bishop Emeritus of Aurangabad.
John H. Edwards, 79, British geneticist.
David Lee "Tex" Hill, 92, American fighter pilot and flying ace, member of the Flying Tigers.
Juca, 78, Portuguese footballer and coach (Sporting, national team).
Rauni Mollberg, 78, Finnish film director, leukemia. 
Pat "Gravy" Patterson, 73, American baseball and football coach at Louisiana Tech, suicide by gunshot.
Roy Rosenzweig, 57, American historian, lung cancer.
Carlos Salgado, 67, Honduran journalist and comedian, shot.
David Salmon, 95, American Athabascan tribal chief, cancer.
Werner von Trapp, 91, Austrian-born musician and singer, member of the Trapp Family Singers who inspired The Sound of Music.

12

Paulo Autran, 85, Brazilian actor, lung cancer.
Kim Beazley Sr., 90, Australian politician, former government minister.
Lonny Chapman, 87, American actor (The Birds, Norma Rae, The Hunted), heart disease.
Noel Coleman, 87, British actor.
Ruby Hooper, 83, American first female major party candidate to run for Governor of North Carolina, 1993 North Carolina Mother of the Year.
Kisho Kurokawa, 73, Japanese architect, heart failure.
Judy Mazel, 63, American cookbook author (The Beverly Hills Diet), complications from peripheral vascular disease.
Rajinder Singh Sarkaria, 91, Indian Supreme Court judge (1973–1981), head of the Sarkaria Commission.
Soe Win, 59, Burmese Prime Minister (2004–2007), leukemia.

13

Vernon Bellecourt, 75, Native American activist, pneumonia.
Andrée de Jongh, 90, Belgian Resistance member, organized the Comet Line POW escape network.
Bob Denard, 78, French mercenary.
Obaidul Huq, 95, Bangladeshi journalist and filmmaker.
Alec Kessler, 40, American basketball player (Georgia Bulldogs, Miami Heat), heart attack.
Kribensis, 23, Irish racehorse.
Marion Michael, 66, German actress and singer, heart failure.
James L. Oakes, 83, American federal judge.
Jim Poston, 63, British diplomat, Governor of the Turks & Caicos Islands (2002–2005).

14
Salih Saif Aldin, 32, Iraqi correspondent for The Washington Post, shot.
Big Moe, 33, American rapper, heart attack.
Judy Crichton, 77, American television producer, leukemia.
George Neil Jenkins, 92, British scientist.
Philippe Malaud, 82, French diplomat and politician.
André Maréchal, 90, French optics researcher.
Raymond Pellegrin, 82, French actor.
Frances Rich, 97, American actress and sculptor, heart attack.
Slew o' Gold, 27, American thoroughbred racehorse and Hall of Fame inductee, euthanized.
Pentti Snellman, 81, Finnish Olympic athlete.
Sigrid Valdis, 72, American actress (Hogan's Heroes), lung cancer.

15
Jackie Little, 95, British footballer (Ipswich Town).
Bobby Mauch, 86, American child actor and film editor.
Bernard Scudder, 53, British poet and translator of Icelandic literature.
Robert Shields, 89, American Protestant minister and diarist.
Vito Taccone, 67, Italian cyclist, heart attack.
Lucius Theus, 85, American airforce major-general, Tuskegee Airman.
Ernest Withers, 85, American photographer, stroke.

16

*Rosalio José Castillo Lara, 85, Venezuelan Roman Catholic cardinal.
Barbara West Dainton, 96, British  survivor.
Ignacy Jeż, 93, Polish Roman Catholic bishop.
Deborah Kerr, 86, British actress (From Here to Eternity, Black Narcissus, The King and I), complications of Parkinson's disease.
Arbab Jehangir Khan, 72, Pakistani politician, former NWFP Chief Minister, cardiac arrest.
Jerzy Markuszewski, 76, Polish theatre director and dissident.
Ragnar Pedersen, 65, Norwegian illustrator.
Toše Proeski, 26, Macedonian singer, car accident.
Steve J. Spears, 56, Australian author, playwright and television writer, cancer.
M. A. Hadi, 68, Bangladeshi academic, Vice Chancellor of Bangabandhu Sheikh Mujib Medical University, brain haemorrhage.

17

Billy Berroa, 79, Dominican Spanish broadcaster for New York Mets on WADO, prostate cancer.
Joey Bishop, 89, American entertainer, last surviving member of the Rat Pack.
Teresa Brewer, 76, American pop and jazz singer, supranuclear palsy.
Sammy Duddy, 62, British political activist, member of the Northern Irish loyalist UPRG, heart attack.
Germán Espinosa, 69, Colombian writer, cancer. 
Delphia Hankins, 111, American supercentenarian who was Mississippi's oldest person.
Maria Kwaśniewska, 94, Polish javelin thrower, 1936 Olympic bronze medallist.
Peter Oliver, Baron Oliver of Aylmerton, 86, British law lord (1986–1992).
Aminu Safana, 46, Nigerian MP, heart attack.
Taku, 14, American orca at SeaWorld San Antonio.
Rüdiger von Wechmar, 83, German diplomat and politician.
Robert A. Young, 83, American member of the US House of Representatives from Missouri (1977–1987), liver disease.

18

Alan Coren, 69, British writer and satirist, editor of Punch (1978–1987), cancer.
William J. Crowe, 82, American Ambassador to UK (1994–1997), Chairman of the Joint Chiefs of Staff (1985–1989), cardiac arrest.
Vincent DeDomenico, 92, American inventor of Rice-a-Roni.
Lucky Dube, 43, South African reggae musician, shot during carjacking.
Anthony R. Michaelis, 91, German science journalist.
Nino Rešić, 43, Bosnian singer.
Joe Sellwood, 96, Australian who was oldest living AFL/VFL footballer.
Mark Tavener, British novelist and comedy writer, cancer.

19
Anton Bodem, 82, German Catholic theologian.
Randall Forsberg, 64, American nuclear arms control advocate, cancer.
Michael Maidens, 20, British footballer for Hartlepool United, car accident.
Jan Wolkers, 81, Dutch writer and artist.

20
Peg Bracken, 89, American cookbook writer.
Ivo Cappo, 55, Papua New Guinean magistrate, stoning.
Max McGee, 75, American professional football player (Green Bay Packers), fall from roof.
Jim Mitchell, 60, American professional football player (Atlanta Falcons), heart attack.
Helend Peep, 97, Estonian actor.
Josep Pintat-Solans, 82, Andorran politician and businessman, Mayor of Sant Julià de Lòria (1960-1963) and Prime Minister (1984-1990).
Paul Raven, 46, British rock bassist (Ministry, Killing Joke), heart attack.
Stine Rossel, 32, Danish archaeologist, hiking accident.
Yemi Tella, 56, Nigerian coach of the World Cup–winning under-17 football team, cancer.

21
Surinder Singh Bajwa, 52, Indian politician, Deputy Mayor of Delhi, fall after rhesus macaque attack.
Ernst Ehrlich, 86, Swiss Jewish philosopher.
Don Fellows, 84, American actor.
Paul Fox, 56, British guitarist (The Ruts), lung cancer.
Lance Hahn, 40, American musician (J Church, Cringer) and journalist, kidney disease.
Peter Howard, 81, British Air Vice Marshal, Royal Air Force.
Siddiq Khan, 60, Pakistani cricket umpire.
R. B. Kitaj, 74, American-born British-based pop artist.
Peter Moffatt, 84, British television director (All Creatures Great and Small, Doctor Who).
Ileana Sonnabend, 92, Romanian-born American founder of Sonnabend Gallery.
Lloyd Wendt, 99, American newspaper editor and publisher.

22
Sargon Boulus, 63, Iraqi poet.
Ève Curie, 102, French author, daughter of Pierre and Marie Curie.
Billy Ray Hamilton, 57, American death row inmate, natural causes.
Brendan McWilliams, 63, Irish meteorologist and writer.
 Soedarpo Sastrosatomo, 87, Indonesian businessman.

23

John Ilhan, 42, Australian founder of Crazy John's mobile phone retail chain, suspected heart attack.
David Kendall, 89, British mathematician.
*Lim Goh Tong, 90, Malaysian Chinese billionaire, founder of the Genting Group.
Ursula Vaughan Williams, 96, British author and poet, wife of Ralph Vaughan Williams.

24
David Adams, 78, Canadian ballet dancer, after long illness.
Petr Eben, 78, Czech composer.
Peter Harding, 82, British rock climber.
Alisher Saipov, 26, Kyrgyz journalist, shot.
Masakazu Yoshizawa, 57, Japanese-born American flutist (Memoirs of a Geisha, Jurassic Park), stomach cancer.

25
Carole Hillard, 71, American politician, Lieutenant Governor of South Dakota (1995–2003), pneumonia.
Michael England, 89, English cricketer.
Puntsagiin Jasrai, 73, Mongolian Prime Minister (1992–1996).
Sir Richard Rougier, 75, British judge, lung cancer.
Harvey Shapiro, 97, American cellist.

26
Jacinta Balbela, 88, Uruguayan judge and jurist, member of the Supreme Court of Justice (1985–1989).
Jim Cummins, 62, American correspondent for NBC News, cancer.
Nicolae Dobrin, 60, Romanian footballer, lung cancer.
Friedman Paul Erhardt, 63, German-born pioneering television chef, "Chef Tell," inspiration for the Swedish Chef, heart failure.
Alexandre Feklisov, 93, Russian KGB spymaster.
John L. Gaunt, 83, American Pulitzer Prize-winning photographer, congestive heart failure.
Arthur Kornberg, 89, American recipient of the 1959 Nobel Prize in Physiology or Medicine, respiratory failure.
Lisa Richette, 79, American lawyer, judge of the Philadelphia County Court of Common Pleas, lung cancer.
Khun Sa, 73, Burmese warlord.
Hans Stern, 85, Brazilian jeweler, founder of the company H.Stern.

27
Charles Batt, 78, Australian politician.
*George Washington, 4, Irish race horse, euthanized.
Satyen Kappu, 76, Indian Bollywood character actor, cardiac arrest.
Moira Lister, 84, South African-born British-based actress.
Leslie Orgel, 80, British chemist.
Othman Saat, 80, Malaysian politician, former Chief Minister of Johor state.
Henk Vredeling, 82, Dutch politician, minister and European Commissioner.

28
*Bao Zunxin, 70, Chinese intellectual and jailed Tiananmen Square democracy activist, brain hemorrhage.
Graham Chadwick, 84, British bishop and anti-apartheid campaigner.
Arnold Wilson Cowen, 101, American judge.
Takao Fujinami, 74, Japanese politician convicted of accepting bribes.
Evelyn Hamann, 65, German actress.
Jimmy Makulis, 72, Greek singer.
Guido Nicheli, 73, Italian actor, stroke.
Stuart Sidey, 99, New Zealand politician, Mayor of Dunedin (1959–1965).
Josef Stawinoga, 87, Polish hermit, lived nearly 40 years in tent next to Wolverhampton Ring Road.
Porter Wagoner, 80, American country music singer, lung cancer.
William George Wilson, 90, American cinematographer.

29
Eloise Baza, 54, Guamanian president of the Guam Chamber of Commerce (1984–2007).
Jan Borkus, 87, Dutch radio actor.
Anthony Clare, 64, Irish psychiatrist and broadcaster.
Sam Dana, 104, American football player, complications of infection.
Kenneth Franzheim II, 82, American oilman and philanthropist.
Jarmila Loukotková, 84, Czech author.
Frane Matošić, 89, Croatian football player.
Jesse J. McCrary, Jr., 70, American politician, Secretary of State of Florida, (1978–1979), lung cancer.
Thomas Joseph Meskill, 79, American politician and federal judge, Governor of Connecticut (1971–1975).
David Morris, 83, British painter and actor.
Christian d'Oriola, 79, French fencer.
La Sa Ra, 91, Indian Tamil novelist.
Carrie Rozelle, 69, Canadian-born education activist, wife of Pete Rozelle, cancer.
Senkichi Taniguchi, 95, Japanese film director, pneumonia.

30
Robert Goulet, 73, American singer and actor (Camelot, Beetlejuice), idiopathic pulmonary fibrosis.
Peter Hoagland, 66, American member of the U.S. House of Representatives from Nebraska (1989–1995), Parkinson's disease.
Izzy Katzman, 90, American sportswriter.
Norbert Lynton, 80, German-born British art historian.
Srđan Mrkušić, 92, Serbian football goalkeeper.
Yisrael Poliakov, 66, Israeli actor, member of comedy group HaGashash HaHiver.
Dina Rabinovitch, 44, British journalist, breast cancer.
Paul Roche, 91, British poet and translator.
Linda S. Stein, 62, American former manager of the Ramones, real estate agent, beaten.
Washoe, c.42, American-trained African-born chimpanzee believed to be first non-human to acquire human language, influenza.
John Woodruff, 92, American Olympic gold medalist in 800m (1936), atrial fibrillation and chronic renal failure.

31
Alderbrook, 18, British racehorse, winner of the 1995 Champion Hurdle.
John Baker, Jr., 72, American football player and county sheriff.
Sir Kenneth Bradshaw, 85, British constitutionalist, Clerk of the House of Commons (1983–1987).
Ray Gravell, 56, British rugby union player for Wales.
Erdal İnönü, 81, Turkish physicist and politician, Deputy Prime Minister (1991–1993), leukemia.
Bradford Kelleher, 87, American former vice president of the Metropolitan Museum of Art, founder of the Met Store.

References

2007-10
 10